Tosapusia turriformis is a species of sea snail, a marine gastropod mollusk, in the family Costellariidae, the ribbed miters.

Description
The length of the shell attains 27.1 mm.

Holotype
The holotype of the species (MNHN IM-2013-19792), measured 27.15 mm.

Distribution
This species occurs in the Bismarck Sea, Papua New Guinea.

References

Costellariidae
Gastropods described in 2017